Antoine-Pierre-Louis Bazin, or A. P. L. Bazin (26 March 1799 – January 1863) was a French sinologist born in Saint-Brice-sous-Forêt. He was the brother of dermatologist Pierre-Antoine-Ernest Bazin (1807-1878).

Bazin studied at the Collège de France, where he was a pupil of Jean-Pierre Abel-Rémusat (1788-1832) and Stanislas Julien (1797-1873). Beginning in 1840 he was a professor of Chinese at the École des langues orientales. During his career, he also served as assistant director of the Société Asiatique. He contributed numerous articles to the Journal asiatique and published translations of Yuan dynasty plays.

Works 
 Théâtre Chinois; Ou, Choix De Pièces De Théâtre, Composées Sous Les Empereurs Mongols, Traduites Pour La Première Fois Sur Le Texte Original, Précédées D'une Introduction Et Accompagnées De Notes. (Paris: Imprimerie royale,  1838). Hathi Trust Digital Library Online Version
 Notice du ″Chan-Haï-King″, cosmographie fabuleuse attribuée au grand Yu (1840).
 Kao, Ming. Le Pi-Pa-Ki: Ou, L'histoire Du Luth: Drame Chinois De Kao-Tong-Kia Représenté À Péking, En 1404 Avec Les Changements De Mao-Tseu. (Paris: Impr. royale, Histoire Du Luth.,  1841).   ISBN  Hathi Trust Digital Library Online Version 
 Rapport fait à la Société Asiatique sur une chrestomathie chinoise publiée à Ning po en 1846 (1848)
 Le Siècle des Youên, ou Tableau historique de la littérature chinoise, depuis l'avènement des empereurs mongols jusqu'à la restauration des Ming (1850)
 Recherches sur les institutions administratives et municipales de la Chine (1854)
 Recherches sur l'origine, l'histoire et la constitution des ordres religieux dans l'Empire chinois (1856) Hathi Trust Digital Library Online Version
 Grammaire mandarine, ou Principes généraux de la langue chinoise parlée (1856)
 Notice historique sur le Collège médical de Péking, d'après le ″Taï-thsing-hoeï-tièn″ (1857)
 Mémoires sur l'organisation intérieure des écoles chinoises (1859)
Ho-Han-Chan ou La Tunique Confrontée. - Translation of Zhang Guobin. zaju He hanshan. The title of this play has also been translated as "Joining the Shirt".

References 
Birch, Cyril. "Introduction: The Peach Blossom Fan as Southern Drama." In: K'ung, Shang-jen. Translators: Chen, Shih-hsiang and Harold Acton. Collaborator: Birch, Cyril. The Peach Blossom Fan (T'ao-hua-shan). University of California Press, 1976. .
Das traditionelle chinesische Theater Vom Mongolendrama bis zur Pekinger Oper (Volume 6 of Geschichte der chinesischen Literatur, Wolfgang Kubin, 9783598245404). K.G. Saur. Walter de Gruyter, 2009. , 9783598245435.
Kaske, Elisabeth. The Politics of Language in Chinese Education: 1895 - 1919. BRILL, 2008. , 9789004163676.
Liu, Wu-chi, "The Common Man as a Dominant Theme in Yüan Drama." (Archive) 1969. p. 92-101. Document in English, with two-page extract in Traditional Chinese.
Tian, Min. The Poetics of Difference and Displacement: Twentieth-Century Chinese-Western Intercultural Theatre. Hong Kong University Press, June 1, 2008. , 9789622099074.

Notes

External links

1799 births
1863 deaths
People from Val-d'Oise
French sinologists
Members of the Société Asiatique
Collège de France alumni
Chinese–French translators
19th-century French translators